Savage Creek is a stream in the U.S. state of Tennessee. It is a tributary to the Collins River.

Savage Creek was named after Samuel Savage, a pioneer citizen.

References

Rivers of Tennessee
Rivers of Grundy County, Tennessee
Rivers of Sequatchie County, Tennessee